Justin Willis may refer to:

 Justin Willis (martial artist) (born 1987), American mixed martial artist
 Justin Willis (soccer) (born 1988), American soccer player